Notarcha polytimeta is a moth in the family Crambidae. It was described by Turner in 1915. It is found in Australia, where it has been recorded from Queensland and the Northern Territory.

The larvae feed on Brachychiton bidwillii.

References

Moths described in 1915
Spilomelinae